The  San Francisco 49ers season was the franchise's 63rd season in the National Football League (NFL), the 67th overall, the second under the head coach/general manager tandem of Jim Harbaugh and Trent Baalke, and their penultimate season at Candlestick Park. After going 13–3 and reaching the NFC Championship the year before, the 49ers topped that success with their first NFC championship since 1994 as well as their sixth overall as a franchise, overcoming a 17–0 deficit to defeat the Atlanta Falcons 28–24 on January 20, 2013 in the NFC title game. However, the season ended with their first-ever defeat in the Super Bowl, falling to the Baltimore Ravens, 34–31. With that game, the Ravens replaced the 49ers as the only team with multiple appearances to never lose a Super Bowl; they have since been joined by the Tampa Bay Buccaneers in this capacity.

This season was also highlighted by the signing of star wide receiver Randy Moss, who had come out of retirement after initially retiring following the 2010 season. As a 49er, Moss appeared in his second Super Bowl but failed to win one again as he previously lost in Super Bowl XLII to the New York Giants when he was part of the 2007 New England Patriots.

2012 NFL Draft

NOTES
 The 49ers acquired this fourth-round selection from the Indianapolis Colts along with a 2013 fifth-round selection in exchange for a 2012 third-round selection (#92 overall; used to select WR T. Y. Hilton).
 The 49ers acquired this fourth-round selection from the Miami Dolphins along with a sixth-round selection (#196 overall) and a 2013 sixth-round selection, in exchange for a 2012 fourth-round selection (#97 overall; used to select RB Lamar Miller).
 The 49ers acquired the sixth-round selection from the Carolina Panthers along with a 2013 third-round selection in exchange for a 2012 fourth-round selection (#103 overall; used to select DE Frank Alexander).
 The 49ers acquired this fourth-round selection from the Detroit Lions in exchange for a 2012 fourth-round selection (#125 overall; used to select LB Ronnell Lewis)and a 2012 sixth-round selection (#196 overall; used to select DB Jonte Green).

Staff

Final roster

Quarterback controversy
Quarterback Alex Smith missed two starts mid-season after suffering a concussion, and backup Colin Kaepernick successfully filled in. A quarterback controversy began. Smith was ranked third in the NFL in passer rating (104.1), led the league in completion percentage (70%), and had been 19–5–1 as a starter under Harbaugh, while Kaepernick was considered more dynamic with his scrambling ability and arm strength. After Smith was fully recovered, Harbaugh chose Kaepernick as the starter for the 8–2–1 49ers, but also stated that the assignment was week-to-week and not necessarily permanent. However, Kaepernick started the remainder of the season through Super Bowl XLVII. Smith was traded to Kansas City after the season.

Preseason

Regular season

Game summaries

Week 1

    
    
    
    
    
    
    
    
    

The 49ers prove they are a force to be reckoned with in the NFL as they beat the Packers 30–22. This is the 49ers first win at Lambeau Field since 1990. With the win, the 49ers started their season 1–0.

Week 2

    
    
    
    
    
    
    
    
    
    

With the win, the 49ers improved to 2–0.

Week 3

    
    
    
    
    
    
    

With the loss, the 49ers fell to 2–1 and into a tie with the Seahawks in 2nd place in the NFC West behind the 3–0 Cardinals.

Week 4

    
    
    
    
    
    

After a tough road loss, the Niners continued on the road to face the Jets.  The team would improve to 3–1 as they handed the Jets their 2nd shutout home loss in 2 years.

Week 5

    
    
    
    
    
    
    
    

With the huge win, the 49ers improved to 4–1.  2–0 against the AFC East.

Week 6

    
    
    
    
    
    
    

With the huge loss, the 49ers fell to 4–2.

Week 7

With the win, the 49ers improved to 5–2.

Week 8

Alex Smith completed 18-of-19 passes for 232 yards and three touchdowns without an interception in a 24–3 Monday night win over Arizona.  With the win, the 49ers went into their bye week at 6–2.

Week 10

Smith suffered a concussion in the second quarter, throwing a touchdown with blurred vision before exiting the game. He was replaced by Colin Kaepernick, and the game ended in a 24–24 tie.

With the tie game, the Niners' season stood at 6–2–1.  This would also be the first NFL tie game since 2008 when the Bengals and Eagles played to a 13-point tie.  This is also the first tie game between both the Rams and Niners since a 20–20 tie game in 1968.

Week 11

Kaepernick started his first NFL game with Smith out with a concussion from the previous week. Kaepernick completed 16 of 23 for 246 yards with two touchdowns and no interceptions in a 32–7 win against a strong Bears defense. 49ers head coach Jim Harbaugh spoke highly of Kaepernick's performance after the game, leaving open the possibility of Kaepernick continuing to start. "Usually tend to go with the guy who's got the hot hand, and we've got two quarterbacks that have got a hot hand," Harbaugh said. He dismissed any rule that a player should not lose their starting job due to an injury. With the win, the 49ers improved to 7–2–1.

Week 12

Smith was cleared to play the day before the game, but Harbaugh chose not to rush him back and again started Kaepernick. In a rematch of the 2011 playoffs against New Orleans, the 49ers won 31–21 with Kaepernick throwing for a touchdown and running for another. The 49ers defense also returned two Drew Brees interceptions for touchdowns. With the win, the Niners improved to 8–2–1 and also to 2–0 under Kaepernick as a starter.

Week 13

With their loss to the Rams, the 49ers fell to 8–3–1 on the season.  Kaepernick's record as a starter dropped to 2–1.

Week 14

With the win the 49ers improved to 9–3–1 giving them their 2nd straight winning season and moving to 3–0 against the AFC East. Also Kaepernick's starting record improved to 3–1.

Week 15

The 49ers held on to win despite a furious Patriots rally where they erased a 31-3 San Francisco lead to tie the game. With the win the 49ers improved to 10–3–1 and became the only team in the NFC West to defeat all 4 AFC East teams.  Kaepernick's starting record also improved to 4–1.

Week 16

The game was originally scheduled for 1:25 PM PST, but was flexed to the Sunday night slot, thus denying Fox a chance to air a game between the 49ers and Seahawks in 2012 as the game in Candlestick Park was played on a Thursday night.

Week 17

The Niners returned home for a Week 17 rematch against the Cardinals.  Needing a win to capture the NFC West crown, the team would be down 3–0 after the first quarter.  Up 7–6 at halftime, the Niners outscored the Cardinals 20–7 in the second half to win the game 27–13 and finished the season with their 2nd straight division title and the NFC's #2 seed with a record of 11–4–1 while going 5–2 under Kaepernick as a starter.

Standings

Postseason schedule

Game summaries

NFC Divisional Playoffs: vs. (3) Green Bay Packers

    
    
    
    
    
    
    
    
    
    
    
    

In his first career playoff game, 25-year-old 49ers quarterback Colin Kaepernick rushed for 181 yards and two touchdowns, setting both the NFL single-game record for rushing yards by a quarterback as well as the 49ers postseason record for rushing, regardless of position. He also passed for 263 yards and two scores. Overall, San Francisco racked up 579 yards, including a franchise record 323 rushing yards, and scored a touchdown in every quarter to earn their second consecutive trip to the NFC championship game.

However, Kaepernick didn't get off to a good start. Less than two minutes into the game, he threw a pass that was intercepted by Sam Shields and returned 52 yards for a touchdown. But he quickly rallied his team back, completing a 45-yard pass to running back Frank Gore before taking the ball into the end zone himself on a 20-yard run. Later in the period, Green Bay took a 14–7 lead with Aaron Rodgers' 44-yard completion to James Jones setting up an 18-yard touchdown run by DuJuan Harris. The Packers then forced a punt, but returner Jeremy Ross muffed the kick and C. J. Spillman recovered it for San Francisco on the Packers 9-yard line. Two plays later, Kaepernick tied the score at 14 with a 12-yard touchdown pass to Michael Crabtree. Then defensive back Tarell Brown intercepted a pass from Rodgers, setting up Kaepernick's second touchdown pass to Crabtree, this one from 20 yards out.

With 2:39 left in the half, Rodgers' 20-yard touchdown pass to Jones tied the score at 21. But on the 49ers next drive, a pair of runs by Kaepernick for gains of 19 and 17 yards enabled David Akers to kick a 36-yard field goal, sending the teams into their lockers rooms with San Francisco leading 24–21.

In the third quarter, Green Bay drove 76 yards in 9 plays, featuring a 30-yard reception by Greg Jennings and scored a Mason Crosby field goal. But the tie turned out to be short lived. On the third play of their next drive, Kaepernick faked a handoff, rolled right, and took off for a career long 56-yard touchdown run, retaking the lead at 31–24. Then after a punt, he completed a 44-yard pass to tight end Vernon Davis, setting up Gore's 2-yard touchdown run on the first play of the fourth quarter. Following another punt, Kaepernick led the 49ers back for more points, this time on a 93-yard drive. First he ran for a 16-yard gain, and later he completed a 17-yard throw to tight end Delanie Walker. On the next play, Gore's 26-yard burst moved the ball to the Packers 27-yard line. Anthony Dixon eventually finished the 11-play drive with a 2-yard touchdown run, making the score 45–24.

With under a minute left, Rodgers threw a 3-yard touchdown pass to Jennings. But any hope of a miracle comeback was dashed when Walker recovered the ensuing onside kick attempt.

Crabtree was the top receiver of the game, with 9 catches for 119 yards and two touchdowns. Gore rushed for 119 yards and a touchdown, while also catching two passes for 48 yards. Linebacker Patrick Willis had 7 tackles and a sack. Rodgers finished 26/39 for 257 yards and two touchdowns, with 1 interception, while also rushing for 28 yards. Kaepernick finished the game responsible for more yards gained (444) than the entire Packers team (352).

NFC Championship: at (1) Atlanta Falcons

    
    
    
    
    
    
    
    

San Francisco overcame a 17-point deficit, the largest comeback ever in an NFC championship game, to earn their sixth Super Bowl appearance in franchise history.

Atlanta dominated the first quarter, mainly on plays by receiver Julio Jones, who caught 5 passes in it for 100 yards, including a 46-yard touchdown catch on their opening drive, and a 27-yard reception on their next drive to set up a Matt Bryant field goal. Following a punt, Matt Ryan hit Roddy White for a 23-yard gain on the last play of the first quarter. Then he threw a 20-yard touchdown pass to Jones on the first play of the second, giving the Falcons a 17–0 lead.

This time San Francisco struck back with an 80-yard scoring drive, with Frank Gore rushing for 20 yards and Vernon Davis catching a pass for 27. LaMichael James finished the drive with a 15-yard touchdown run. Then after forcing a three-and-out, Colin Kaepernick rushed for 23 yards and completed three passes to Davis for 48 yards, the last a 4-yard touchdown pass to make the score 17–14. But Atlanta stormed back as Ryan completed five passes for double-digit gains on their next drive, the last one a 10-yard score to tight end Tony Gonzalez with 25 seconds left in the half.

The 49ers took the opening kickoff and drove 82 yards, with Kaepernick completing two passes to Randy Moss for 38 yards and one to tight end Delanie Walker for 20. Gore completed the drive with a 5-yard touchdown run, cutting their deficit to 24–21. On Atlanta's ensuing possession, defensive back Chris Culliver gave San Francisco a great chance to tie or take the lead by intercepting a pass from Ryan and returning it to the Falcons 25-yard line. But San Francisco failed to gain a first down and came up empty when David Akers hit the uprights on a 38-yard field goal try. Later on, the 49ers got another scoring opportunity when defensive lineman Aldon Smith recovered a fumble from Ryan on his own 40-yard line. They subsequently drove deep into Falcons territory, but once again they failed to score when defensive back Dunta Robinson stripped the ball from Michael Crabtree on the 1-yard line as he was trying to get in for the go-ahead score, and linebacker Stephen Nichols recovered it.

With 12 minutes left in regulation, Ted Ginn Jr.'s 20-yard punt return gave San Francisco the ball on the Falcons 38-yard line. Five plays later, Gore scored his second touchdown on a 9-yard run, giving the 49ers their first lead of the game at 28–24. Atlanta responded with a drive to the 49ers 13-yard line, but consecutive incompletions on third and fourth down caused a turnover on downs with just 1:13 left in the game.

Atlanta managed to force a punt and get the ball with 13 seconds to go. Ryan completed a pass to Jones on the final play, but he was tackled at the 49ers 35-yard line as time expired.

Kaepernick finished 16/21 for 233 yards and a touchdown, along with 21 rushing yards. Davis caught 5 passes for 106 yards and a score. Gore rushed for 90 yards and two touchdowns. Ryan completed 30 of 42 passes for 396 yards and three touchdowns, with one interception. Jones caught 11 passes for 182 yards and two touchdowns, while White had 7 receptions for 100 yards. Gonzalez caught 8 passes for 78 yards and a score.

Super Bowl XLVII: vs. (A4) Baltimore Ravens

    
    
    
    
    
    
    
    
    
    
    
    
    

In what seemed like it would be a blowout win for the Ravens, the Niners rallied in the 2nd half. With the Ravens leading 28–6, Jacoby Jones returned a kickoff  for a touchdown at the start of the 2nd half. For a period, the 49ers outscored the Ravens 25–6, and had a chance to take the lead late in the game. However, the Ravens defense was strong, stopping the 49ers offense at the 4-yard line and forcing a turnover on downs. This marked the first time ever in franchise history the Niners had lost a Super Bowl as their overall record dropped to 13–5–1 on the season and 2–1 in the postseason.  The loss made their Super Bowl record 5–1. This game is known as "The Harbowl", as it was the first time in Super Bowl history two brothers faced off against each other as coaches. Additionally, it was the first Super Bowl since Super Bowl XXXVII in 2003 to not feature Tom Brady, Ben Roethlisberger, or Peyton Manning. This tradition would hold until Super Bowl LIV, which ironically also featured the 49ers.

References

External links
 
 

San Francisco
San Francisco 49ers seasons
NFC West championship seasons
National Football Conference championship seasons
San
2012 in San Francisco